The Connaught Cup Stakes is a Thoroughbred horse race run annually at Woodbine Racetrack in Toronto, Ontario, Canada. Run in late May, the Grade II race is open to horses aged four and older.  Raced over a distance of seven furlongs on turf, it currently offers a purse of $196,750.

The Connaught Cup was first run in 1912 on dirt at Toronto's Old Woodbine Race Course. As a result of World War I, there was no race held in 1918 and 1919 and it was not run in 1930. The Great Depression saw much consolidation in the horse racing industry with track owners reducing the number of races run and the amount of the purses being offered. The Connaught Cup was suspended after the 1932 running and was not revived until 1952. In 1956 it was moved to the newly built Woodbine Racetrack where in 1958 it was converted to a turf race.

It was run in two divisions in 1984.

Since inception, the race has been contested at various distances:
On dirt:
  miles : 1912 through 1955 at Old Woodbine Race Course, 1956-1957 at Woodbine Racecourse

On turf:
 7 furlongs : beginning 2010 at Woodbine Racetrack
 1 mile :  1994 at Fort Erie Racetrack
  miles : 1958-1963, 1980–93, 1995-2009 at Woodbine Racetrack
  miles : 1964-1966, 1979 at Woodbine Racetrack, 1967-1978 at Fort Erie Racetrack

Records
Speed  record: (at present distance of 7 furlongs)
 1:19.40 - Tower of Texas (2017)

Most wins:
 2 - Plate Glass (1912, 1913)
 2 - King Maple (1955, 1956)
 2 - E. Day (1964, 1965)
 2 - James Bay (1968, 1969)
 2 - Bridle Path (1981, 1984)
 2 - Kiridashi (1997, 1998)
 2 - Something Extra (2012, 2013)

Most wins by an owner:
 5 - J. K. L. Ross (1916, 1920, 1922, 1924, 1927)
 5 - Stafford Farms (1975, 1976, 1978, 1979, 1980)

Most wins by a jockey:
 8 - Robin Platts (1968, 1969, 1975, 1976, 1978, 1979, 1988, 1992)

Most wins by a trainer:
 5 - Gil Rowntree (1975, 1976, 1978, 1979, 1980)

Winners

*In 1978, Hopeful Answer finished first but was disqualified and set back to second.

See also
 List of Canadian flat horse races

References

Graded stakes races in Canada
Turf races in Canada
Flat horse races for four-year-olds
Recurring events established in 1912
Woodbine Racetrack
Fort Erie Race Track
1912 establishments in Ontario